August Putk (11 February 1899 Lihula Parish (now Lääneranna Parish), Wiek County – ?) was an Estonian politician. He was a member of I Riigikogu, representing the Estonian Independent Socialist Workers' Party. He was a member of the Riigikogu since 25 April 1922. He replaced Kustas Köidam. On 22 June 1922, he resigned his position and he was replaced by August Sprenk.

References

1899 births
Year of death missing
People from Lääneranna Parish
People from Kreis Wiek
Estonian Independent Socialist Workers' Party politicians
Members of the Riigikogu, 1920–1923